, also known in Japan as , is an action video game developed by Nihon Game (now Culture Brain) and published by Taiyo System and Taito for arcades in October 1984. Chinese Hero is the first game in the Super Chinese series by Culture Brain. It was ported to the Nintendo Entertainment System as Kung-Fu Heroes in Japan by the company Nihon Game in 1986 and was released in North America in 1989. The title saw a release on the Nintendo Switch Online service on August 21, 2019.

Plot

Monsters have taken Princess Min-Min captive and have stolen the 10 treasures of the nameless land the game takes place in, leaving everything in sorrow. Kung-fu Masters Jacky and Lee return from training and must set out to rescue the princess and find the treasures.

Gameplay

The player controls one of the characters, Jacky or Lee, and each level pits the player against countless enemy warriors.  The goal is for the player to defeat enough enemies so that the door at the top of the room opens allowing the player to exit the room and proceed to the next.  Enemies' attacks and weapons vary throughout the game. There are quite a number of BONUS levels that players can enter.

Reception 
In Japan, Game Machine listed Chinese Hero on their October 15, 1984 issue as being the most-successful table arcade unit of the month.

References

External links 
Kung Fu Heroes (NES port) at GameFAQs

Chinese Hero at arcade-history

1984 video games
Super Chinese
Arcade video games
Beat 'em ups
Kitkorp games
Nintendo Entertainment System games
Action video games
Video games developed in Japan
Virtual Console games
Virtual Console games for Wii U
Wuxia video games
Nintendo Switch Online games